may refer to:

Science and technology

Astronomy 
 Cluster (spacecraft), constellation of four European Space Agency spacecraft
 Cluster II (spacecraft), a European Space Agency mission to study the magnetosphere
 Asteroid cluster, a small asteroid family
 Galaxy cluster, large gravitationally bound groups of galaxies, or groups of groups of galaxies
 Supercluster, the largest gravitationally bound objects in the universe, composed of many galaxy clusters
 Star cluster
 Globular cluster, a spherical collection of stars whose orbit is either partially or completely in the halo of the parent galaxy
 Open cluster, a spherical collection of stars that orbits a galaxy in the galactic plane

Biology and medicine 
 Cancer cluster, in biomedicine, an occurrence of a greater-than-expected number of cancer cases
 Cluster headache, a neurological disease that involves an immense degree of pain
 Cluster of differentiation, protocol used for the identification and investigation of cell surface molecules present on white blood cells
 Winter cluster, in beekeeping, a well-defined cluster of honey bees in cold temperatures
 Disease cluster, a grouping of cases of disease
 Gene cluster, a group of genes (or proteins, or metabolites) whose expression or concentration is similar across a range of conditions
 Cluster of microorganisms, as in a colony

Computer science 
 Computer cluster, a set of computers that work together
 Data cluster, a group of disk sectors used in a File Allocation Table

Equipment 
 Cluster bomb, a type of air-dropped or ground-launched shells
 Instrument cluster of an automobile
 A bicycle cogset, either a freewheel, or cassette
 The set of tubes attached to a cow's teats for automatic milking

Math and statistics 
 Cluster analysis, a set of techniques for grouping a set of objects based on intrinsic similarities
 Cluster sampling, a sampling technique used when "natural" groupings are evident in a statistical population
 Cluster graph, in graph theory, a disjoint union of complete graphs
 Clusterable graph, in balance theory

Other uses in science and technology 
 CLUSTER, the Consortium Linking Universities of Science and Technology for Education and Research
 Cluster (physics), a small group of atoms or molecules
 Cluster chemistry, an array of bound atoms intermediate in character between a molecule and a solid
 Consonant cluster, in linguistics
 Language cluster or dialect cluster, a geographic distribution of languages

Arts and media

Music 
 Tone cluster, a musical chord comprising at least three consecutive tones in a scale
 Cluster (album), the 1971 eponymous album by the band Cluster
 Cluster (band), a German electronic group
 "Cluster", a track from the album Ben Bu Sarkiyi Sana Yazdim by Cem Adrian
 "Cluster", a song by P-Model from the album Big Body
 Cluster One, the first track on Pink Floyd's 1994 album The Division Bell
 "Cluster", an extended play by the pop-punk band Waterparks

Other media 
 Cluster (novels) by Piers Anthony
 Cluster, a poetry collection by Souvankham Thammavongsa
 The Cluster, a character from the TV series Steven Universe

Urban development 
 Business cluster, a geographic cluster of competitive businesses
 Research-intensive cluster, a region with a high density of research-oriented organizations
 Cluster home, a type of housing development

Other uses 
 Cluster, Pleasants County, West Virginia
 Cluster diagram, general type of diagram, which represents some kind of cluster
 Clusterfuck or cluster, slang term for a messy situation, arising in the US Marine Corps
 Clusters School of Digital Arts, an animation and visual effects training school

See also 
 Clustering (disambiguation)